Prasinalia is a genus of beetles in the family Buprestidae, containing the following species:

 Prasinalia cuneata (Horn, 1868)
 Prasinalia imperialis (Barr, 1969)

References

Buprestidae genera